HNF4 (Hepatocyte Nuclear Factor 4) is a nuclear receptor protein mostly expressed in the liver, gut, kidney, and pancreatic beta cells that is critical for liver development.  In humans, there are two isoforms of HNF4, HNF4α and HNF4γ, encoded by two separate genes  and  respectively.

Ligands
HNF4 was originally classified as an orphan receptor that exhibits constitutive transactivation activity apparently by being continuously bound to a variety of fatty acids. The existence of a ligand for HNF4 has been somewhat controversial, but linoleic acid (LA) has been identified as the endogenous ligand of native HNF4 expressed in mouse liver; the binding of LA to HNF4 is reversible.

The ligand binding domain of HNF4, as with other nuclear receptors, adopts a canonical alpha helical sandwich fold and interacts with co-activator proteins.

HNF4 binds to the consensus sequence AGGTCAaAGGTCA in order to activate transcription.

Pathology 
Mutations in the HNF4A gene have been linked to maturity onset diabetes of the young 1 (MODY1).

This seems to be caused by HNF4-a's  role in the synthesis of SHBG, which is known to be severely diminished in patients with insulin-resistance.

See also 
 Hepatocyte nuclear factors
 Hepatocyte nuclear factor 4A

References

External links 
 

Intracellular receptors
Transcription factors